Route 112 is a highway in southwest Missouri. Both termini are with Route 37. The northern terminus is in Cassville and the southern terminus is in Seligman.

The numbering of this highway is unusual. In Missouri, even-numbered highways are normally east–west routes and Route 112 is a north–south highway.  The only other time this occurs is highways which are numbered from highways from other states which continue into Missouri and the numbering is retained.

Route description

Major intersections

Related route

Route 112 Spur serves as the main road into Roaring River State Park.  Although unsigned, it appears on the official state highway map.

References 

112
Transportation in Barry County, Missouri